"Car Radio" is a song written and recorded by American musical duo Twenty One Pilots originally appearing on their second studio album Regional at Best. It was re-released on March 18, 2014, as the sixth and final single from their third studio album, Vessel.

Background 
The song was inspired by an event which had happened to frontman Tyler Joseph during college. In an interview with Rock Sound, he explained that one day he arrived to class late and forgot to lock his car's door. After class, he returned to discover that someone had broken into his car and stolen everything inside, including the radio, GPS and his CDs. At the time, Joseph didn't have the finances necessary to afford to replace what was lost. The subsequent experience of going on without his car radio made him realize "music can act as a distraction and can get in the way of where your mind wants to go."

Composition
According to the sheet music published at Musicnotes.com by Alfred Publishing, "Car Radio" is written in the time signature of common time, with a slow tempo of 65 beats per minute. "Car Radio" is composed in the key of A minor, while Tyler Joseph's vocal range spans one octave, from a low of C4 to a high of C5. The song has a basic sequence of F–G–Am–G during the verses and interludes and follows Fmaj7–G6–Am–G6 at the refrain as its chord progression. One of the band's more streamlined numbers, "Car Radio" starts off as a brooding alt-pop and rap rock anthem before exploding into existential rave-hop and electronic rock at its euphoric climax.
Its musical composition has a song structure that is "way out in left field" due to the fact it contains no chorus and no hook. The song's verses talk about a true story of Tyler Joseph being late to a class at college and losing his car radio.

Music video 
The music video was uploaded to YouTube on April 19, 2013, and was directed by Mark C. Eshleman of Reel Bear Media. It was shot at a concert. Tyler Joseph sits in a bathroom singing the song, he then shaves off all of his hair, puts on a ski mask, and heads out to the stage where Josh Dun is seen playing drums. Joseph walks into the crowd which is standing still, and once Joseph jumps, the crowd jumps with him. Joseph surfs the crowd to the platform and performs the rest of the song on stage with Dun. As the song ends, Joseph is seen by himself on the stage and the crowd is gone. He takes off his mask, revealing his face once again (as well as his full head of hair, as if it were never shaven). Joseph then sings the final lyrics to the song, in which he falls backwards off the stage and the screen turns to black, ending the video.

As of October 2022, the video has garnered over 282 million views on YouTube.

Live performances 
On April 13, 2014, Twenty One Pilots performed the song at the 2014 MTV Movie Awards. On the 28th of the same month, the band performed the song on Late Night with Seth Meyers. They also performed the song at BBC Radio 1's Big Weekend 2016 on May 28.

Track listing

Personnel 

 Tyler Joseph –  lead vocals, guitar, piano, synthesizers, programming, keyboard, bass
 Josh Dun – drums, percussion

Charts

Weekly charts

Year-end charts

Certifications

Release history

References

External links

2014 singles
Twenty One Pilots songs
2011 songs
Fueled by Ramen singles
Rap rock songs
Electronic rock songs
Songs written by Tyler Joseph
Song recordings produced by Greg Wells